The 1998–99 Gonzaga Bulldogs men's basketball team represented Gonzaga University in the West Coast Conference (WCC) during the 1998–99 NCAA Division I men's basketball season. Led by second-year head coach Dan Monson, the Bulldogs were  overall in the regular season  and played their home games on campus at the Charlotte Y. Martin Centre in Spokane, Washington.

The top-seeded Zags won the conference tournament at Santa Clara, and were seeded tenth in the West regional of the NCAA tournament. Unranked and sent to Seattle, they recorded the program's first NCAA tournament wins with upsets of Minnesota and #7 Stanford, the region's second seed. In the Sweet Sixteen at Phoenix, Gonzaga edged sixth-seeded Florida by a point, but fell by five in the Elite Eight to third-ranked Connecticut, the eventual national champion, and finished at

Roster

Schedule

|-
!colspan=9 style="background:#002967; color:white;"| Regular Season

|-
!colspan=9 style="background:#002967; color:white;"| WCC Tournament

|-
!colspan=9 style="background:#002967; color:white;"| NCAA tournament

References

Gonzaga Bulldogs men's basketball seasons
Gonzaga
1998 in sports in Washington (state)
1999 in sports in Washington (state)
Gonzaga